Zuienkerke Airfield  is a ULM-only airfield located near Zuienkerke, West Flanders, Belgium. Like many recreational aerodromes in Belgium, its use is subject to prior permission from the operator.

See also
List of airports in Belgium

References

External links 
 Zuienkerke Aviation Sport
 Airport record for Zuienkerke Airport at Landings.com

Airports in West Flanders